FC Zenit may refer to:
 FC Zenit Saint Petersburg, a Russian football club
 FC Zenit-2, reserve team of Zenit Saint Petersburg
 FC Zenit Penza, a Russian football club
 FC Zenit-Izhevsk Izhevsk, a Russian football club
 FC Chelyabinsk, a Russian football club formerly known as FC Zenit Chelyabinsk
 FK Čáslav, a Czech football club formerly known as FC Zenit Čáslav

See also
Zenit (disambiguation)